Batumi is the second largest city of Georgia and the capital of the Autonomous Republic of Adjara, located on the coast of the Black Sea in Georgia's southwest. It is situated in a subtropical zone at the foot of the Caucasus. Much of Batumi's economy revolves around tourism and gambling (it is nicknamed "The Las Vegas of the Black Sea"), but the city is also an important seaport and includes industries like shipbuilding, food processing and light manufacturing. Since 2010, Batumi has been transformed by the construction of modern high-rise buildings, as well as the restoration of classical 19th-century edifices lining its historic Old Town.

History

Early history
Under Hadrian, it was converted into a fortified Roman port and later deserted for the fortress of Petra founded in the time of Justinian I. Garrisoned by the Roman-Byzantine forces, it was formally a possession of the kingdom of Lazica until being occupied briefly by the Arabs, who did not hold it; In 780 Lazica fell to kingdom of Abkhazia via a dynastic union, the later led the unification of the Georgian monarchy in the 11th century.

In the late 15th century, after the disintegration of the Georgian kingdom, Batumi passed to the princes of Guria, a western Georgian principality under the sovereignty of the kings of Imereti.

A curious incident occurred in 1444 when a Burgundian flotilla, after a failed crusade against the Ottoman Empire, penetrated the Black Sea and engaged in piracy along its eastern coastline until the Burgundians under the knight Geoffroy de Thoisy were ambushed while landing to raid Vaty, as Europeans then knew Batumi. De Thoisy was taken captive and released through the mediation of the emperor John IV of Trebizond.

Ottoman rule
In the 15th century in the reign of the prince Kakhaber Gurieli, the Ottomans conquered the town and its district but did not hold them. They returned to it in force a century later and inflicted a decisive defeat on the Georgian armies at Sokhoista. Batumi was recaptured by the Georgians several times, first in 1546 by prince Rostom Gurieli, who lost it soon afterwards, and again in 1609 by Mamia II Gurieli. In 1703, Batumi again became part of the Ottoman Empire. In the one-and-a-half century of Ottoman rule it grew into a provincial port serving the Empire's hinterlands on the eastern fringes of the Black Sea. After the Ottoman conquest, Islamization of the hitherto Christian region began but this was terminated and to a great degree reversed, after the area was re-annexed to Russian Imperial Georgia after the Russo-Turkish War of 1877–78.

Imperial Russian rule

It was the last Black Sea port annexed by Russia during the Russian conquest of that area of the Caucasus. In 1878, Batumi was annexed by the Russian Empire in accordance with the Treaty of San Stefano between Russia and the Ottoman Empire (ratified on 23 March). Occupied by the Russians on 28 August 1878, the town was declared a free port until 1886. It functioned as the center of a special military district until being incorporated in the Kutaisi Governorate on 12 June 1883. Finally, on 1 June 1903, with the Artvin Okrug, the Batum Okrug was established as the Batum Oblast and placed under the direct administration of the Viceroy of the Caucasus.

The expansion of Batumi began with the construction of the Batumi–Tiflis–Baku Transcaucasus Railway (completed in 1883), and the Baku–Batumi pipeline which opened in 1907. Henceforth, Batumi became the chief Russian oil port in the Black Sea. The population increased rapidly doubling within 20 years: from 8,671 inhabitants in 1882 to 12,000 in 1889. By 1902 the population had reached 16,000, with 1,000 working in the refinery for Baron Rothschild's Caspian and Black Sea Oil Company.

In the late 1880s and after, more than 7,400 Doukhobor emigrants sailed for Canada from Batumi, after the government agreed to let them emigrate. Quakers and Tolstoyans aided in collecting funds for the relocation of the religious minority, which had come into conflict with the Imperial government over its refusal to serve in the military and other positions. Canada settled them in Manitoba and Saskatchewan.

Russian Civil War, Soviet Union, and 1991 independence
During 1901, sixteen years prior to the October Revolution, Joseph Stalin, the future leader of the Soviet Union, lived in the city organizing strikes. On 3 March 1918, the Treaty of Brest-Litovsk gave the city back to the Ottoman Empire, confirmed in the Treaty of Batum of June 1918 between the Ottoman Empire and the new Democratic Republic of Georgia. As result of the end of World War I the British took control over Batumi from December 1918, who stayed until July 1920 when the city and province was transferred to the Democratic Republic of Georgia, which gave Adjara autonomy. In 1921 Kemal Atatürk ceded the northern part of Adjara, including Batumi, to the Bolsheviks who reconquered the Transcaucasian republics, on the condition that it be granted autonomy for the sake of the Muslims among Batumi's mixed population.

When Georgia regained its independence from the Soviet Union in 1991, Aslan Abashidze was appointed head of Adjara's governing council and subsequently held onto power throughout the unrest of the 1990s. While Abkhazia and South Ossetia areas attempted to break away from the Georgian state, Adjara remained an integral part of the republic. Instead, Abashidze turned Adjara into his personal fiefdom. In May 2004, he fled to Russia after mass protests in Batumi, which concluded the 2004 Adjara crisis.

Post-1991
Batumi today is one of the main port cities of Georgia. It has the capacity for 80,000-ton tankers to take materials such as oil that are shipped through Georgia from Central Asia. Additionally, the city exports regional agricultural products. Since 1995 the freight conversion of the port has constantly risen, with an approximate 8 million tons in 2001. The annual revenue from the port is estimated at between $200 million and $300 million.

Since the change of power in Adjara, Batumi has attracted international investors, and the prices of real estate in the city have trebled since 2001. In July 2007, the seat of the Constitutional Court of Georgia was moved from Tbilisi to Batumi to stimulate regional development. Several new hotels opened after 2009, first the Sheraton in 2010 and the Radisson Blu in 2011. The city features several casinos that attract tourists from Turkey, where gambling is illegal.

Batumi was host to the Russian 12th Military Base. Following the Rose Revolution, the central government pushed for the removal of these forces and reached an agreement in 2005 with Moscow. According to the agreement, the process of withdrawal was planned to be completed in 2008, but the Russians completed the transfer of the Batumi base to Georgia on 13 November 2007, ahead of schedule.

Geography

Climate 

Batumi has a humid subtropical climate (Cfa) according to Köppen's classification. The city's climate is heavily influenced by the onshore flow from the Black Sea and is subject to the orographic effect of the nearby hills and mountains, resulting in significant rainfall throughout most of the year, making Batumi the wettest city in both Georgia and the entire Caucasus Region.

The number of days with daily temperatures above  is 239. The city receives 1958 hours of sunshine per year.

Batumi generally does not receive significant amounts of snow (accumulating snowfall of more than ), and the number of days with snow cover for the year is 12. The average level of relative humidity ranges from 70 to 80%.

Subdivisions 
According to the March 31, 2008, decision of the Batumi City Council, Batumi is divided into seven boroughs, those of:

Old Batumi (ძველი ბათუმის უბანი)
Rustaveli (რუსთაველის უბანი)
Khimshiashvili (ხიმშიაშვილის უბანი)
Bagrationi (ბაგრატიონის უბანი)
Aghmashenebeli (აღმაშენებლის უბანი)
Javakhishvili (ჯავახიშვილის უბანი)
Tamar (თამარის უბანი)
Boni-Gorodok (ბონი-გოროდოკის უბანი)
Airport (აეროპორტის უბანი)
Gonio-Kvariati (გონიო-კვარიათის უბანი)
Kakhaberi (კახაბრის უბანი)
Batumi Industrial (ბათუმის სამრეწველო უბანი)
Green Cape (მწვანე კონცხის უბანი)

Cityscape

Contemporary architecture 

Batumi's skyline has been transformed since 2007 with remarkable buildings and monuments of contemporary architecture, including:
Radisson Blu hotel
Public Service Hall
Hilton Batumi
Leogrand

A large Kempinski hotel and casino is to open in 2013, a Hilton Hotel as well as a 47-storey Trump Tower is also planned.

Novelty architecture 
Novelty architecture in Batumi includes:
Sheraton Hotel, designed in the style of the Great Lighthouse at Alexandria, Egypt
Alphabetic Tower ( high), celebrating Georgian script and writing
Batumi Piazza, a mixed-used development in the form of an Italian piazza
Buildings designed in the style of a lighthouse, the Acropolis, and an upside-down White House

Sites of interest

Main sights 

Attractions include
Adjara State Museum
Aquarium
Batumi Botanical Garden
Circus
Former resort area along the Black Sea coast.

Tourist attractions 

 Batumi Boulevard
 The statue of “Man and Woman“ AKA “Ali and Nino” by Georgian artist, Tamara Kvesitadze
 Batumi Botanical Gardens
 Cafe Fantasy
 Dancing Fountains, Batumi
 Dolphinarium
 Piazza Square
 Panoramic Wheel
 Astronomical clock
 Argo Cable Car
 6 May Park
 Europe Square
 Alphabetic Tower
 Batumi Sea Port
 Miracle Park
 Chacha Clock Tower (defunct)
 Fountain Of Neptun
 Batumi Archeological Museum
 Monument Of Ilia Chavchavadze

Demographics

Religion
Although there is no religious data available separately for Batumi, the majority of the region's inhabitants are Eastern Orthodox Christian, and primarily adhere to the national Georgian Orthodox Church. There are also Muslim, Catholic, Armenian Apostolic, Jehovah's Witness, Seventh-day Adventist, and Jewish communities.

The main places of worship in the city are:
Georgian Orthodox Cathedral of the Mother of God, and Saint Barbara Church
Catholic Church of the Holy Spirit
Saint Nicholas Church
Batumi Mosque
Batumi Synagogue

Culture 
Batumi has 18 various museums, including State Art Museum of Adjara. Rugby Union club Batumi RC competes in the Pan-european Rugby Europe Super Cup and the Georgian Didi 10. Football club FC Dinamo Batumi play at the Batumi stadium.

Notable people 
Notable people who are from or have resided in Batumi:

 Irakli Alasania (*1973), Georgian politician, Minister of Defense
 Herbert Backe, Reich Minister of Food in Nazi Germany
 Ioseb Bardanashvili (*1948), composer
 Khatia Buniatishvili (*1987), concert pianist
 Odysseas Dimitriadis (1908–2005), Greek-Soviet music conductor
 Roman Dolidze (*1988), mixed martial artist
 Mary, Princess Eristavi (1888–1986), Georgian princess and model
 , (1887–1978), writer
 Devi Khajishvili (*1991), actor
 Sopho Khalvashi (*1986), first Georgian entrant to the Eurovision Song Contest 2007
 Mindia Khitarishvili (*1973), composer
 Konstantin Meladze (*1963), composer and producer
 Valery Meladze (*1965), singer
 Katie Melua, singer
 Lado Seidishvili (1931–2010), Georgian painter and poet
 Joseph Stalin (1878–1953), General secretary of the Communist Party of the Soviet Union
 Arkady and Boris Strugatsky (1925–1991 ; 1933–2012), science fiction authors
 William Horwood Stuart (1857–1906), British diplomat who was murdered there in 1906
 Sergei Yesenin (1895–1925), Russian lyrical poet
 Fyodor Yurchikhin (*1959), astronaut

Economy and infrastructure

Transport 

The city is served by Batumi Airport, one of three international airports in the country.
A bike-sharing scheme named BatumVelo allows you to rent a bicycle on the street with a smart card.

The main types of public transport are buses, minibusses, and taxis. Batumi has modern electric buses. Using the service is possible by BATUMICARD, transit card, or debit/credit cards. Buses connect almost everywhere in the city.

The port of Batumi is on one of the routes of China's proposed Eurasian Land Bridge (part of the "New Silk Road"), which would see an eastern freight link to China via Azerbaijan and the Caspian Sea, and a western link by ferry to Ukraine and on to Europe.

Postage stamps

Twin towns – sister cities

Batumi is twinned with:

 Bari, Italy (1987)
 Savannah, United States (1992)
 Trabzon, Turkey (2000)
 Vanadzor, Armenia (2006)
 Volos, Greece (2007)
 Yalta, Ukraine (2008)
 Burgas, Bulgaria (2009)
 Marbella, Spain (2010)
 Kuşadası, Turkey (2010)
 Ordu, Turkey (2011)
 Ternopil, Ukraine (2011)
 Ashdod, Israel (2011)
 New Orleans, United States (2012)
 Yalova, Turkey (2012)
 Nakhchivan, Azerbaijan (2012)
 Daugavpils, Latvia (2012)
 Donetsk, Ukraine (2013)
 Prague 1, Czech Republic (2013)
 Sharm El Sheikh, Egypt (2014)
 Ürümqi, China (2015)
 Brest, Belarus (2015)
 Paphos, Cyprus (2016)
 Nysa, Poland (2017)
 Mogilev, Belarus (2017)
 Netanya, Israel (2018)
 Wrocław, Poland (2019)
 Constanța, Romania (2020)

See also
 Adjara
Hotel Intourist Palace

References

Georgian Soviet Encyclopedia. Georgian SSR (Supplementary Edition). 1981. pp. 16–18.

External links

Official website
Official Visitor Guide to Batumi
Official instagram of Batumi
Batumi – History, Sights and Personalities
Batumi Photo Gallery
Postcard from the Silk Road – Batumi...(Georgia), TRAVELS – ESPECIALLY FOR „ZNAD WILII”, Leonard Drożdżewicz, „Znad Wilii”, Viešoji įstaiga „Znad Wilii” kultūros plėtros draugija,ISSN 1392-9712 indeks 327956 nr 1 (57) z 2014 r., p. 87–98, (in Polish)http://www.znadwiliiwilno.lt/wp-content/uploads/2020/04/Znad-Wilii-57m.pdf
Petroleumworld

 
Georgian Black Sea coast
Cities and towns in Adjara
Batum Oblast
Kutaisi Governorate
Pontus (region)
Port cities in Asia
Port cities of the Black Sea
Greek colonies in Colchis
Port cities in Europe
Self-governing cities in Georgia (country)